CFVM-FM is a French-language Canadian radio station located in Amqui, Quebec.

Owned and operated by Bell Media, it broadcasts on 99.9 MHz with an effective radiated power of 23,800 watts (class C1) using an omnidirectional antenna.

Previously a station with an oldies format from "Boom" from 2005 to February 2009, the station has now an adult contemporary format and is part of the "Rouge FM" network which operates across Quebec and Eastern Ontario.

Originally known as CFVM when it was on 1220 kHz, the station moved to FM in April 2003 after 23 years on AM. The new FM signal also replaced CFVM-1, a short-lived relay in nearby Causapscal which was operational from 1997 to 2003 on 1450 kHz; that facility was previously used by the Canadian Broadcasting Corporation as a relay of what was then CBGA 1250, and is now CBGA-FM 102.1, in Matane.

On August 18, 2011, at 4:00 p.m. EDT, all "RockDétente" stations, including CFVM, rebranded as Rouge FM. The last song under "RockDétente" was "Pour que tu m'aimes encore" by Celine Dion, followed by a tribute of the branding. The first song under "Rouge" was "I Gotta Feeling" by Black Eyed Peas.

References

External links
99,9 Rouge
 

Fvm
Fvm
Fvm
Fvm
Matane
Radio stations established in 1980
1980 establishments in Quebec